Notamacropus is a genus of small marsupials in the family Macropodidae, commonly known as wallabies (among other species).

In 2019, a reassessment of macropod taxonomy determined that Notamacropus and Osphranter, formerly considered subgenera of Macropus, should be moved to the genus level. This change was accepted by the Australian Faunal Directory in 2020.

Species

References

External links

Macropods
Marsupials of Australia
Marsupial genera